Sciacca (Latin: Thermae Selinuntinae, Thermae Selinuntiae, Thermae, Aquae Labrodes and Aquae Labodes) is a town and comune in the province of Agrigento on the southwestern coast of Sicily, southern Italy. It has views of the Mediterranean Sea.

History

Thermae was founded in the 5th century BC by the Greeks, as its name suggests, as a thermal spa for Selinunte, 30 km distant, whose citizens came there to bathe in the sulphurous springs, still much valued for their medical properties, of Mount San Calogero which rises up behind the town. There is no account of the existence of a town on the site during the period of the independence of Selinunte, though the thermal waters would always have attracted some population to the spot. It seems to have been much frequented in the time of the Romans. At a later period they were called the Aquae Labodes or Larodes, under which name they appear in the Itineraries. Pliny was most likely mistaken in assigning the rank of a colonia to the southern, rather than northern, town of the same name. Strabo mentions the waters (.)

The origin of the town's name has been much debated, with Latin "ex acqua", as a reference to the springs of thermal water of the area, or Arabic "Syac", meaning bath, and al Saqquah, dating back to the cult of the Syrian god "Shai al Quaaum", as possibilities.

The city walls, the bastions and the Old Castle owe their existence to Roger the Great Count.

A royal city that had remained faithful to Manfred of Sicily during the Angevine invasion, by 1268 A.D. Sciacca was besieged by Charles I of Anjou and surrendered the following year. After the Sicilian Vespers, it established itself as a free commune. During the Aragonese-Angevine wars it was besieged numerous times, after which the Peralta family took possession of it and obtained from the king of Sicily the right to mint coins. In the following centuries, the town was at the center of bloody feuds between rival baronial families (the Luna, of Aragonese origin, and the Perollo, of Norman stock), which nearly halved its population. In 1647, the impoverished town was the seat of an anti-Spanish rebellion.

During World War II, the Italian Regia Aeronautica (Royal Air Force) had a base near Sciacca.

Geography

Overview
The municipality borders Caltabellotta, Menfi, Ribera and Sambuca di Sicilia.

Climate
Sciacca has a Mediterranean climate (Köppen climate classification: Csa), with short, mild and moderately rainy winters and long, hot and dry summers. The city receives around 450 millimeters (17.7 inches) of rain per year, experiencing a peak of 72.3 millimeters (2.8 inches) in November and a minimum of 2.5 millimeters (0.1 inch) in July.

Main sites

Sciacca still retains much of its medieval layout, which divided the town into quarters, each laid out on a strip of rock descending toward the sea. Sciacca has several points of interest, including:
Cathedral of Maria SS. del Soccorso (12th century, rebuilt in 1685)
Castle of the Counts Luna; scarce remains can be still seen
Church of Santa Margherita
Chiesa del Carmine
Church of San Michele (1371, rebuilt in the 17th century)
Church of Santa Maria delle Giummare
Palazzo Steripinto
Palazzo Tagliavia (11th century), in neogothic style
Palazzo Perollo (15th century)

Culture
Sciacca's festivals include the Carnival, celebrated during the week before the beginning of Lent (February). The highlight of the festival is the parade of bizarre figures mounted on floats, famous throughout Sicily for their gaudy expressions. Sciacca is also the hometown of the Mediterranean Scene.

Starting around the turn of the 20th century, a number of residents of the Sciacca area emigrated to Norristown, Pennsylvania and the North End of Boston.

The Boston-based descendants of Sciacca, especially those from fishing families, have celebrated the Festival of the Madonna del Soccorso since 1910.

The Norristown-based descendants of Sciacca, through the local M.S.S. Club, maintain both traditions and devotions to the Madonna del Soccorso. The M.S.S. holds a communion breakfast in February and a large festival (often called simply "The Feast") in August in celebration of the miracles performed by the Madonna herself in Sciacca.

The local television stations are TRS Tele Radio Sciacca and RMK Tele Radio Monte Kronio.

Economy
The economy of Sciacca is mainly based on agriculture, fishing and related food industries, as well as tourism.

Gallery

Sister cities
  Salvador, Brazil, since 2001
  Kırşehir, Turkey, since 2011
  Mustafakemalpaşa, Turkey, since 2011

People
Cataldo Amodei (1649–1693), Baroque composer
Giuseppe Mario Bellanca (1886–1960), airplane designer who created the first monoplane in the United States with an enclosed cabin
Jon Bon Jovi, American singer-songwriter and founder of the rock band Bon Jovi, ancestry traced to Sciacca
Johnny Dundee (1893–1965), world featherweight and super featherweight champion
Anthony Fauci, director of the National Institute of Allergy and Infectious Diseases, ancestry traced to Sciacca
Tommaso Fazello (1498–1570), authored the first printed history of Sicily
Giovanni Antonio Medrano (1703–1760), one of the architects who designed the San Carlo opera house in Naples
Mike Piazza, Baseball Hall of Famer, ancestry traced to Sciacca
Andrea Tummiolo (born 1984), footballer
Joey Gallo, Baseball player, grandparents (father) immigrated to Bensonhurst, Brooklyn from Sciacca

References

External links

Guide to Sciacca 

 
Coastal towns in Sicily
Ancient cities in Sicily
Roman towns and cities in Italy
Populated places established in the 5th century BC
5th-century BC establishments in Italy